Irish Famine 1861 refers to the famine that occurred in 1861, Ireland. The Western part was hit hardest.

In 1861, there were reports of famine in Ireland.

Three-fourths of the potato crop were destroyed, and the people of western Ireland were worse off than in 1847.

It has been reported that England declined extraordinary relief.

See also
Irish famine (disambiguation)

References 

Famines in Ireland
1861 in Ireland 
19th-century famines
1861 disasters in Ireland